The Armed Forces Retirement Home refers to one of two facilities, one in Gulfport, Mississippi, the other in Washington, D.C., that house veterans and active duty members of the United States Armed Forces.

Current status
In 1991 Congress incorporated the U.S. Naval Home (opened in 1834) and U. S. Soldiers' and Airmen's Home (founded in 1851) into an independent establishment of the Executive Branch of the Federal Government named the Armed Forces Retirement Home (AFRH) Agency. In 2002, the names of the two homes were officially changed to The Armed Forces Retirement Home – Gulfport and The Armed Forces Retirement Home – Washington.

Both Homes are model retirement centers, where residents can maintain an independent lifestyle in an environment designed for safety, comfort and personal enrichment. Military veterans from all service branches can live at either Home.  A few less than 900 men and women, with an average age in the eighties, currently reside at the homes. Residents are free to come and go as they please.  Meals are served in the Dining Halls three times daily.  The Wellness Center offers medical, dental, optometric and podiatry service on site.  Extensive on-site recreational facilities (swimming pool, gym, movie theatre, computer game room, etc,) are available. While residents are welcome to park and use private vehicles and RVs at the Homes,  in-house transportation is offered to local hospitals, military commissaries, exchanges and shopping.  As residents age, "Independent Living Plus," "Assisted Living", "Memory Support" and "Long Term Custodial Care" are available in-house when necessary. Complete eligibility rules for entrance to the Armed Forces Retirement Home can be found at www.afrh.gov .  Career military personnel have priority. Enlisted, Warrant Officers,  and Limited Duty Officers with a minimum of twenty years of service at age 60, veterans incapable of earning a livelihood because of a service-connected disability incurred in the line of duty, veterans who served in a War Zone or Hostile Fire Zone and are later found to be incapable of earning a livelihood, and women veterans who served before 12 June 1948, may be eligible.

History

English roots
The colonial settlers brought with them from Britain ideas about the responsibilities of the individual towards his community, and of the community towards the volunteer soldier:

It was in the reign of Elizabeth, not long before the beginning of English colonization in America ...  What to do with ... soldiers returning from her wars ... Able bodied and unemployed were given to riot, violence, theft. The disabled and maimed became vagabonds and beggars. The feudal system had been destroyed.  Parliament passed the first statute ... for relief of Souldiours  in the 1592–93 session. ... The Honor of our Nation, that such as have since the 25th day of March 1588, adventured their lives and lost their limbs ... be relieved and rewarded ... that others may be encouraged to perform the like.

During the 1680s the restored Monarchy introduced a standing army of professional regiments. Rather than pay these troops a service pension upon retirement, King Charles II had erected an invalids home in 1690, now called the Royal Hospital Chelsea .

Throughout the seventeenth and eighteenth centuries from New England to the Carolinas, laws were passed by the colonies to provide for the injured and wounded volunteer colonial soldiers back from the Indian Wars on the frontier.  During the American Revolution, both the states and the Continental Congress made provision for disability pensions, but Congress was reluctant to fund so-called half-pay-for-life service pensions for commissioned officers, because they wanted no part of "Standing Armies," or "Career Soldiers" and had no money in any event. In the end, Congress agreed to pay the Officers the equivalent of five years pay at the end of their service, and enlisted people got $80 dollars.<ref>Glasson, pp. 23–24, 41; also see Hatch, L.C., The Administration of the American Revolutionary Army</u>, Harvard Historical Studies Vol. X, New York, 1904</ref>

From that time until 1885 there were no retirement pensions for either commissioned officers or enlisted personnel. Finally, in 1885, retirement plans were provided for enlisted Army and enlisted Marines.  Navy enlisted had to wait until 1899 for a retirement pension. The absence of retirement pensions drove efforts to establish homes for the disabled and decrepit soldiers and sailors.

Naval Home timeline

In response to attacks by Barbary Pirates in the Mediterranean the new Federal Congress passed legislation in 1794 to build a small Navy, and then as part of responding to French Privateer attacks on U.S. Merchant Marine shipping during the Quasi-War of 1798–1800 Congress passed a bill in 1798 for the establishment of doctors and marine hospitals at port cities to care for merchant sailors. This Merchant Marine doctor & hospital service eventually evolved into the U.S. Public Health Service. The following year, 2 March 1799,  an act of Congress authorized U.S. Navy Seamen admission to the Merchant Marine hospitals.  Twenty cents per month was deducted from the Seamen's pay and paid to what was then the "Naval Hospital Fund"  for the purpose of medical care and hospitals for U.S. Naval personnel. In addition, all proceeds from fines or forfeitures charged misbehaving sailors and officers were added to the Naval Hospital Fund. Today, all active duty personnel contribute Fifty cents a month to the "Armed Forces Retirement Home Trust Fund," and fines and forfeitures are still deposited to the Trust Fund.

On 26 February 1811 Congress passed an act authorizing construction of U.S. Naval Hospitals which included the phrase "...to provide a permanent asylum for disabled and decrepit navy officers, seamen, and marines."  The addition of an "Asylum" (meaning "refuge" in 18th Century English) was in lieu of a retirement or service pension for naval personnel. This act eventually resulted in the purchase of the Pemberton Estate in 1826 for $17,000, which came with a large mansion to be used as a hospital, and the decision to construct a new building for an asylum. William Strickland was selected as Architect and Contractor to build the Philadelphia Naval Asylum.  What was to become  Biddle Hall was completed in 1834.  "The entire cost of the building, excluding the finishing of the attics, was $195,600: about four-ninths of which came from the Treasury directly, the remainder from the Hospital Fund." These Treasury funds were required because the Hospital Fund had gotten into trouble in the 1820s when the Trustee's elected to invest fund assets in private equities rather than Treasury Bonds. From that time to the present, Naval Home Trust Funds have only invested with the U.S. Treasury.  When the U.S. Soldiers' Home and Trust Fund was created in 1851, some of its funds were invested in bonds issued by the states of Virginia and Missouri, from which little or no interest was received during the Civil War, and in the future the Soldiers' Home Trust Fund would also only be invested with Treasury.

Biddle Hall was used to house not only the home for pensioners, but the Asylum staff, a Naval Hospital, an insane asylum and a School for Naval Midshipmen, the predecessor of the Naval Academy at Annapolis.  Some of the residents of the Asylum were buried on the grounds of the Asylum, and then reburied at Mount Moriah Cemetery following the Civil War.  The number of "Inmates" varied over the long history of the Philadelphia Home, beginning with five in 1834, going to 220 in 1885, and 204 on 1 July 1921.  Residents were provided with a small private room, furnished with simple furniture, to which they could add their own furniture. Structural defects noted by Lieutenant Commander George Stockton in his 1886 paper on the Naval Home included the home basement, described as "low and damp" with insufficient drainage,  The rooms in the attic were too hot for comfort, and asking the old and decrepit to climb up and down three flights of stairs from attic to the improperly placed dining commons in the basement was difficult for some of the inmates.

Soldiers Home timeline

The United States Soldiers' Homes was authorized by Congress in 1851.  In 1827, while the Naval Asylum was under construction, Secretary of War James Barbour recommended that an Army Asylum be constructed for soldiers.  For the next twenty years people like Major Robert Anderson (of Fort Sumter fame) promoted the idea of homes for retired soldiers, without success.  The problem was to develop a system of funding a Soldiers' Home that would not involve any expenditure of public money.  In 1846, he wrote to all the regiments in the active army, asking for information on fines and forfeitures from Courts Martial.  He got answers from about half the regiments, added the twenty cents a month for the hospital fund received from the 9,438 enlisted soldiers then on active duty, and was able to estimate the annual revenue from both sources at $42,642, which turned out to be on the low side.  "He computed the annual cost of each member, using the Army clothing allowance of that year of $15.36, and the annual cost of one year's ration at the prevailing rate of ten cents a day, to arrive at an annual cost for each member for these two items, of $51.86."  He also went to the trouble of obtaining per annum inmate costs at five different East Coast insane asylums, and five different East Coast poor houses, which he reckoned at $43.80 per inmate, and sent the results, along with signed petitions from many of the Officer's Corps as the Army marched off to Mexico.  Congress noted that "it does not ask for any contribution from the Treasury."

On 14 September 1847 General Winfield Scott received the surrender of Mexico City, and accepted a "contribution" of  $150,000 in gold from the Mexico City fathers "in lieu of pillage."  General Scott spent part of this on shoes and blankets for his troops. Another portion went to a "Spy Company" he employed on the march from Vera Cruz to Mexico City.  The remaining $118,791.19 he had deposited in a New York bank with the notation "for Army Asylum."  This action outraged the Secretary of War: he accused Gen. Scott of larceny under Art. 58 of the Articles of War, but Scott refused to turn the money over to the Treasury, and in the end he won.
 Article 58 of Articles of War, 1806:  All public stores taken in the enemy's camp towns forts or magazines whether of artillery ammunition clothing forage or provisions shall be secured for the service of the United States for the neglect of which the commanding officer is to be answerable.

In 1851, Senator Jefferson Davis of Mississippi sponsored a bill to establish  "at a suitable place or places, a site or sites for the Military Asylum."  The bill passed both Houses and was signed into law by President Millard Fillmore the same day. The new Board of Commissioners decided to establish four homes, one each in New Orleans, Louisiana; East Pascagoula, Mississippi; Harrodsburg, Kentucky; and Washington, D.C.

Quality of life
During the 19th and most of the 20th centuries the U.S. Naval Home and the U.S. Soldiers' Home, while having identical purpose for being (the welfare of the old and decrepit soldier or sailor), were not identical in regulation, funding, administration or tradition.

1834

The 1834 Naval Regulation for governing the Philadelphia Naval Asylum set forth living conditions for the inmates. The asylum will provide a chaplain and medical care, living quarters, clothing, and food similar to a naval ration at sea, except that the "grog" ration would be replaced by tea, tobacco and pickles. The inmates would surrender any disability Navy pension to the home. They would also work at the asylum "as much as they are able". The inmates would be subject to "all the laws and rules of the naval service" and "shall be under the general government of the officers placed over them".

1851
"Military Asylums" were created (the name was changed to U.S. Soldier's Home in 1859). Disabled or wounded veterans from the War of 1812 forward would be admitted. US Marines who served in Mexico and were otherwise qualified by wound or disability would be admitted.  The rules at the U.S. Soldier's Home were similar but not identical to the Naval Home.  Inmates would surrender any disability pension, work when able, and obey the orders of those appointed above them.  Like the sailors, they were "paid" a dollar a month for spending money.  The inmates referred to this as "the monthly dollar".  General David Twiggs wrote that as soon as the men got their dollar they got drunk and stayed drunk until their money was gone, usually a week later, "as whiskey of a sort could be gotten for a ten cents a quart".  A "Guard House" (the Navy calls them "Brigs") was built at the Soldiers' Home to confine inmates "absent without leave".

Homicide at the Naval Home

I.G. ReportOld Soldiers Home

Today
Alcoholism: In 1951 the Governor of the Soldier's Home adopted a policy requiring proof of good "dry" behavior by men identified as alcoholics. After two failures, men were disallowed reentry to the home.  Today applicants with an alcoholic history must show evidence of a long period without alcohol.  The homes have open bars that sell beer and hard liquor, but "public intoxication" is prohibited.  The smoking of tobacco inside buildings on the grounds of the homes is prohibited. Outside smoking is allowed.

Many work positions, both paid and volunteer, are open to residents.  For example, residents run the home libraries under the supervision of a professional Librarian.  Many positions, such as the wood shop and bicycle shop, are run entirely by residents.

Below are recreational activities available without cost:

Gulfport
Outdoor swimming pool (lap swimming and water aerobics), professionally equipped fitness center and physical fitness programs, library (print, audio and video), individual work areas for arts & crafts, woodworking, painting and other hobbies, bike shop, bowling and bocce center, card, game, and recreation rooms, computer classroom and computer center, fully equipped media room for movies and presentations, multi-purpose area for live entertainment and dances, spacious grounds with basketball, horse shoes and walking paths, bicycling, bus tours to area attractions.

Washington
Nine-hole golf course and driving range (carts provided for residents), two fishing ponds for crappie, bass, bream and catfish, professionally equipped fitness center and physical fitness programs, walking trails, two extensive print, audio and video libraries, individual work areas for ceramics, woodworking, painting and other hobbies, auto hobby shop, bowling, card, game, and recreation rooms, computer center,  garden plots, fully equipped 667-seat theater for movies and live entertainment, bus tours to area attractions.

Funding 

The current legal basis for funding of the Armed Forces Retirement Home Agency is contained in 24 USC § 419 – Armed Forces Retirement Home Trust Fund
 Such amounts as may be transferred to the Fund.
 Moneys deposited in the Fund by the Chief Operating Officer realized from gifts or from the disposition of property and facilities.
 Amounts deposited in the Fund as monthly fees paid by residents of the Retirement Home under section 414 of this title.
 Amounts of fines and forfeitures deposited in the Fund under section 2772 of title 10.
 Amounts deposited in the Fund as deductions from the pay of enlisted members, warrant officers, and limited duty officers under section 1007(i) of title 37.
 Interest from investments made under subsection (c) of this section.

Other sources of income have been used in the past.  At one time a small percentage of the Prize Money awarded for the capture of enemy war ships and pirate vessels, was awarded to the Naval Home Trust Fund. A notation in the "Congressional Record for the Navy Affairs Committee"  in 1907–09 notes that the Naval Home Trust still had a balance of $14 million partly from the capture of Prize Vessels, per an Act of 1870, and from suits for depredation of timber belonging to the United States. It is plain the Navy had an interest in the nation's timberlands when the Navy was still equipped with wooden sailing ships, but why this was true in the 20th Century is unclear.

Funding for the Armed Forces retirement homes has always been based upon the principle of no cost to the public. But when wars happen or economic calamities happen or natural disasters happen, the funding system has failed. That is why the first item of the list above ("...Such amounts as may be transferred to the Fund") is included. This refers to the expenditure of public monies appropriated by Congress. The original Naval Asylum required public monies for construction following an adventure by the trustees of the Naval Hospital Fund into private equity Investment. They invested in private bank stock, intending to get a higher rate of return, but in the 1820s the bank lost money, and so did the trust fund committee of the Secretaries of War, Navy, and Treasury.  The Gulfport home required public funding for a new home after Hurricane Katrina destroyed the old home. The Washington home is receiving public help to rebuild after the earthquake of 2011 damaged the Sherman building. But in general and for most of the time the system of self funding has worked.

AFRH and the Department of Veterans Affairs 

"When the Civil War began on April 12, 1861, it is estimated America had 80,000 Veterans from previous conflicts, some of whom were treated at a handful of Veterans homes scattered across the nation. The Civil War added more than 1.9 million Soldiers, Sailors, and Marines to the rolls." The U.S. Soldiers Home and the Philadelphia Naval Home were completely inadequate to this challenge: thus the "National Asylum for Disabled Volunteer Soldiers," a system of eleven homes with attached hospitals that were built across the country between 1865 and 1930.  These institutions, the foundation of the Department of Veterans Affairs (VA), today have the mission of "hospitalization and rehabilitation and return, as soon as possible, of veterans to civilian life ..." The VA provides representatives to sit on the "Armed Forces Home Trust Fund." Otherwise, the Armed Forces Retirement Home, an agency of the Department of Defense, has no connection whatever to the VA, beyond the historical one, and is today primarily a retirement home.

Notable buildings

The Soldiers' Home occupies a campus in N.W. Washington, D.C. It sits adjacent to two historic cemeteries, Rock Creek Cemetery and United States Soldiers' and Airmen's Home National Cemetery (the forerunner of Arlington National Cemetery).

The Soldiers' Home has had many interesting historic buildings, some of which survive to the present day.  Four of them date to the home's earliest days before the Civil War, and have been designated a National Historic Landmark.

Anderson Cottage

Built in 1843 by the banker George Washington Riggs as a summer cottage for his family, it was a part of the first parcel acquired by the U.S. Military Asylum. Renamed Anderson Cottage for co-founder Major Robert Anderson it housed the first residents of the home. It is now known as President Lincoln's Cottage, and has been a National Monument since 2000. The brick house has a stucco exterior.

Scott Building

Begun in 1852 and completed in the 1890s, Scott Building is named for General Winfield Scott. The initial design for the building was in the Norman Gothic style. It housed 100–200 residents. Its castellated clock tower was used as a watch tower during the American Civil War, especially during General Jubal Early's raid on nearby Fort Stevens.  The building is currently closed due to damage from the 2011 earthquake.  The clocktower will require extensive repairs; the U.S. Congress has appropriated partial funds for the needed work.

Sherman Building

Built to a design by Barton S. Alexander in the 1850s, the Sherman Building is connected to the Scott Building by a central annex. Its exterior is unfinished white marble.

Stanley Hall

Built in 1834, this was a recreation center and is now the Home's Chapel.

Sheridan Building

This building, begun in 1883, was built as a dormitory. It has three stories and is built of red brick.

Grant Building

Begun in 1911, the Grant Building was built as a barracks, mess hall, and recreation center.

Community engagementFriends of the Soldiers Home 
In November 2011, the Armed Forces Retirement Home in Washington and surrounding community held a meeting about ending years of neglect in relating to one another. What blossomed was Friends of the Soldiers Home.

Starting with a Jingo volunteer night in December 2011, Friends went on to partner with the Home to conduct 158 volunteer events through the end of 2015. About 225 people collectively gave more than 1,500 hours of volunteer time in 2015 alone.

Regular events include monthly Jingo, Happy Hour, Saloon Night With Friends and Bowling With Friends. Each spring, the Home and Friends pairs community volunteers with veteran residents to tend vegetable plots together in the Friends Garden Project.

Friends also holds annual community celebrations with the Home, including Spring Fling, which occurs the first Saturday in May, July 4 Fireworks, and Fall Fun Fest, which happens on the first Sunday in October. In December, the Friends and Home residents gather together for the annual holiday tree lighting, and Friends also joins with residents at their holiday dance that month. Thousands of people from the community attended these events to better connect the residents and historic campus with the surrounding nation's capital.

Volunteer opportunities are available every week of the year and details can be found on the Friends of the Soldiers Home website.

Notes

References
 American Institute of Architects, A Guide to the Architecture of Washington. New York: Frederick A. Praeger, 1965.
 Forman, Stephen M., A Guide to Civil War Washington. Washington, D.C.: Elliott and Clark, 1995.
 Truett, Randall Bond, editor. Washington, D.C.: The A Guide to the Nation's Capital, Revised edition, New York: Hastings House, 1968.
 Toll, Ian, Six Frigates: The Epic History of the Founding of the U.S. Navy [Kindle Edition] ,  W.W. Norton & Company (March 17, 2008)
 Goode, Paul R., The United States Soldiers' Home, A History of its First Hundred Years, Privately Published, 1956, 
 Glasson, William H, Ph.D.  Federal Military Pensions In the United States, Oxford University Press, New York, 1918
 Kelly, Patrick J. Creating A National Home, Building the Veterans Welfare State, Harvard University Press, Cambridge MA. 1997
 Hatch, Louis C., The Administration of the Revolutionary Army, New York, Longman Green & Co, 1904
 Laws Relating to the Navy and the Marine Corps, and The Navy Department, July 1, 1865, NAPU Public Domain Reprint, {{ISBN]978-1146069601}}
 Stockton, Chas H. LCDR, USN, "The Naval Asylum and Service Pensions for Enlisted Men," Proceedings of the United States Naval Institute, Vol. XII, 1886, pp. 51–67
 Clark, Robert L., et al, "Privatization of Public-Sector Pensions,"  accessed 20 Oct 2012
 Mansfield, Edward D., "Life and Services of Gen Winfield Scott," AS Barnes & Co. New York, 1852 (Note: a digitized Google Book – this appears to be a campaign biography for Gen Scott in the 1852 election)
 Eisenhower, John S. D., So Far From God: The U.S. War with Mexico, 1846–1848, Univ. of Oklahoma, 2000
 Davis, George B. BG, U.S. Army JAG, "A Treatise on Military Law of the United States," New York, John Wiley & Sons, 1908
 Opinions of the judge advocate general of the army: April 1, 1917, to December 31, 1917, Volume 1 By United States Army Judge Advocate General's Dept. United States. Judge-Advocate General's Dept. (Army), United States. Army. Office of the Judge Advocate General, Washington, GPO, 1919.
 Military Compensation Background Papers, Sixth Edition, May 2005, DOD, https://www.loc.gov/rr/frd/mil-comp.html accessed 23 Oct 2012

External links

 AFRH website
 Gulf Coast News Sep 2006 article on the future for the Gulfport MS AFRH 
 
 Friends of the Soldiers Home website

1991 establishments in the United States
American military personnel
Buildings and structures in Gulfport, Mississippi
Government agencies established in 1991
National Historic Landmarks in Washington, D.C.
Old soldiers' homes in the United States
United States federal boards, commissions, and committees
Veterans' affairs in the United States
Housing in Washington, D.C.
Housing in Mississippi